The Big Chance  is a 1957 black and white British drama film directed by Peter Graham Scott. It stars Adrienne Corri, William Russell, and Ian Colin.

Plot
Bill Anderson is disillusioned with his job as a travel agent and married life with a wife who is content with a quiet life. When a customer calls to postpone his flight, Anderson decides to escape it all by using the customer's ticket as booked and assuming the identity of the man, who left his passport because it required renewing. This has conveniently coincided with him taking over control of his employer's safe in which is stored all the foreign currency, which they supply to customers leaving the country. He makes two falsely initialled briefcases to use in a scheme to get the currency illegally past airport customs. He stays late on a Friday night after everybody else has left and, after emptying the safe of the currency, he heads to the airport for his flight to Panama. However, the airport being closed down because of fog is the first of many interruptions and delays he encounters, along with a woman he meets, Diana, who is also planning to escape to a new life.

Cast
Adrienne Corri as Diana Maxwell
William Russell as Bill Anderson
Ian Colin as Adam Maxwell
Penelope Bartley as Betty Anderson
Ferdy Mayne as Dimitri Aperghis
John Rae as Mr. Jarvis
Mary Jones as Miss Jessop
Douglas Ives as Stan Willett
Doris Yorke as Mrs. Willett
Edwin Richfield as Café Owner
Howard Lang as Saw Mill Man
Peter Swanwick as Passport Official
Richard Shaw as Airport Official
John Walters as Customs Man
Reginald Hearne as Customs Official
Robert Raglan as Police Inspector

References

External links
 

1957 films
British drama films
1957 drama films
Films directed by Peter Graham Scott
Film noir
Films scored by Eric Spear
1950s English-language films
1950s British films